Seine River 23B is a First Nations reserve in northwestern Ontario. It is one of three reserves of the Seine River First Nation.

References

Ojibwe reserves in Ontario
Communities in Rainy River District